Claudia María Poll Ahrens (born 21 December 1972) is a former Costa Rican swimmer who competed in the 200 m to 800 m freestyle events. She is Costa Rica's only Olympic gold-medalist, having won the country's first Olympic gold medals at the 1996 Olympics in the 200 meter freestyle. She is a multiple national record holder in the freestyle events.

Her sister, Silvia, won Costa Rica's first Olympic medal, the silver medal, at the 1988 Games. As of 2021, Claudia and Silvia are the only Costa Ricans to have won a medal at an Olympics. Claudia also competed at the 2000 Olympics, where she won two bronze medals.

Moreover, she was the first person from Central America to win a gold medal, and the only person to do so, until the 2008 Olympic Games when Irving Saladino of Panama won a gold medal.

Career
Claudia Poll began swimming in 1979 under coach Francisco Rivas and quickly became one of the best in Central America, winning many regional titles.

At the 1996 Atlanta Olympics she won the gold medal in the 200 m freestyle event.  The win was the first gold medal for Costa Rica in the Summer Olympic Games.   It was a surprising win because she beat the favorite German Franziska van Almsick.  Dagmar Hase, also from Germany, won the bronze.

In 1997, she was named by Swimming World Magazine as the Female Swimmer of the Year.

At the Sydney 2000, Poll continued with her medal run and won two bronze medals. In Athens 2004, she just missed out on the 400 m freestyle final, finishing ninth in the heats.

In 2002, she was given a four-year doping ban after a failed test for norandrosterone, a metabolite the steroid nandrolone. Her ban was later reduced by FINA to two years. Poll claimed that the test and sampling methods were flawed and protested her innocence.

At the 2006 Central American and Caribbean Games, she set the Games Records in the 200 and 400 freestyles (2:00.19 and 4:15.01), bettering the time her sister Silvia set at the 1986 Central American and Caribbean Games.

Poll served as a swimming analyst for the U.S. Telemundo network's Spanish-language coverage of the 2012 Summer Olympics in London, though she and most of the Telemundo broadcast crew performed their duties at the network's studios in Hialeah, Florida, accompanied by video provided by Olympic Broadcasting Services.

Honors 
Declared "Honor Citizen" by the Costa Rican Congress in 1996 ;
First Latin American woman to win an Olympic swimming gold medal;
Costa Rican Sportswoman of the Year in 1993, 1994, 1995, 1996, 1997, 1998, 1999, and 2000;
Named Best Latin American Athlete in 1995, 1996, and 1997 by the Agencia Prensa Latina
Named 1997 World Swimmer of the Year by Swimming World Magazine; and
Declared Costa Rica's Athlete of the Century in 1999.

Personal

Claudia’s parents are both German, but they moved to Nicaragua before starting a family.  Claudia and her sister Silvia were both born in Managua, Nicaragua, but moved shortly after Claudia’s birth in 1972.  Political tensions were rising and after an earthquake that shook the city, the family decided it would be safer to move to Costa Rica. She, her sister Silvia, and their mother are not related to Marlene Ahrens, another Olympic athlete and medalist and another Latin American of German descent.

Claudia graduated in Business Administration from the Universidad Internacional de las Américas, San José, Costa Rica, in 1998. Poll became a mother for the first time on August 8, 2007. Her daughter's name is Cecilia. Claudia's older sister Silvia Poll was also a competitive swimmer who won a silver medal in 1988, Costa Rica's first ever Olympic medal.

See also
List of doping cases in sport
World record progression 200 metres freestyle
World record progression 400 metres freestyle

References

1972 births
Living people
Costa Rican female swimmers
Costa Rican female freestyle swimmers
Sportspeople from Managua
Olympic swimmers of Costa Rica
Swimmers at the 1996 Summer Olympics
Swimmers at the 2000 Summer Olympics
Swimmers at the 2004 Summer Olympics
Olympic gold medalists for Costa Rica
Olympic bronze medalists for Costa Rica
World record setters in swimming
Olympic bronze medalists in swimming
World Aquatics Championships medalists in swimming
Costa Rican sportspeople in doping cases
Doping cases in swimming
Costa Rican people of German descent
Nicaraguan people of German descent
Medalists at the FINA World Swimming Championships (25 m)
Nicaraguan emigrants to Costa Rica
Medalists at the 2000 Summer Olympics
Medalists at the 1996 Summer Olympics
Olympic gold medalists in swimming
Central American and Caribbean Games medalists in swimming
Central American and Caribbean Games gold medalists for Costa Rica
Competitors at the 2006 Central American and Caribbean Games